PFLAG is the United States' first and largest organization uniting parents, families, and allies with people who are lesbian, gay, bisexual, transgender, and queer (LGBTQ+). PFLAG National is the national organization, which provides support to the PFLAG network of local chapters. PFLAG has over 400 chapters across the United States, with more than 200,000 members and supporters.

PFLAG (pronounced  ) is no longer an acronym, but just the name of the organization. Prior to 2014, the acronym stood for Parents and Friends of Lesbians and Gays (later broadened to Parents, Families and Friends of Lesbians and Gays). Until removal of the hyphen in 1993 the name was officially styled as P-FLAG. In 2014 the membership of the organization voted to officially change the name to PFLAG to reflect the decades of fully inclusive work it had been doing in the LGBTQ+ community.

History

In April 1972, Jeanne Manford, an elementary school teacher, and her husband were at home in Flushing, Queens, when they learned from a hospital's telephone call that her son Morty, a gay activist, had been beaten while distributing flyers inside the fiftieth annual Inner Circle dinner, a political gathering in New York City. In response, she wrote a letter of protest to the New York Post that identified herself as the mother of a gay protester and complained of police inaction. She gave interviews to radio and television shows in several cities in the weeks that followed, sometimes accompanied by her husband or son. On June 25, she participated with her son in the New York Pride March, carrying a hand-lettered sign that read "Parents of Gays Unite in Support for Our Children". Prompted by their enthusiastic reception, they developed an idea for an organization of the parents of gays and lesbians that could be, she later said, "a bridge between the gay community and the heterosexual community". They were soon holding meetings for such parents, with her husband participating as well. She called him "a very articulate person ... a much better speaker than I. He was right along with me on everything."

The first formal meeting took place on March 11, 1973, at the Metropolitan-Duane Methodist Church in Greenwich Village (now the Church of the Village). Approximately 20 people attended. In the next few years, through word of mouth and community need, similar groups sprang up around the country, offering "safe havens" and mutual support for parents with gay and lesbian children. In 1976, PFLAG LA had their first meeting of 30 parents. By 1977, the group had integrated with other LGBT activist groups to oppose Anita Bryant's anti-gay crusade and defeat the statewide Briggs Initiative. Following the 1979 National March on Washington for Lesbian and Gay Rights, representatives from these groups met for the first time in Washington, DC.

By 1980, PFLAG, then known as Parents FLAG, began to distribute information to educational institutions and communities of faith nationwide, establishing itself as a source of information for the general public. When Adele Starr, who organized the Los Angeles P-FLAG chapter, called advice columnist Dear Abby to discuss the purpose of P-FLAG, Dear Abby mentioned PFLAG in one of her columns. Los Angeles P-FLAG then received more than 7,500 letters requesting information. Every letter was answered by a member of the chapter. In 1981, members decided to launch a national organization. The first PFLAG office was established in Los Angeles under founding president Adele Starr.

In 1982, the Federation of Parents and Friends of Lesbians and Gays, Inc., then representing some 20 groups, was incorporated in California and granted nonprofit, tax-exempt status. In 1987, PFLAG relocated to Denver, under President Elinor Lewallen. Also in the 1980s, PFLAG worked to end the US military's efforts to discharge lesbians—more than a decade before military issues came to the forefront of the LGBT movement.  And by the late 1980s, PFLAG began to have notable success in organizing chapters in rural communities.

In 1990, following a period of significant growth, PFLAG employed an Executive Director, expanded its staff, and moved to Washington, DC. Also in 1990, PFLAG President Paulette Goodman sent a letter to Barbara Bush asking for Mrs. Bush's support. The first lady's personal reply stated, "I firmly believe that we cannot tolerate discrimination against any individuals or groups in our country.  Such treatment always brings with it pain and perpetuates intolerance."  Inadvertently given to the Associated Press, her comments caused a political maelstrom and were perhaps the first gay-positive comments to come from the White House.

In time the scope of the organization expanded to include bisexuals, and ultimately, transgender people, but the name remained P-FLAG. In particular, in 1998, gender identity, including transgender people, was added to the mission of PFLAG after a vote at their annual meeting in San Francisco.
PFLAG was the first national LGBT organization to officially adopt a transgender-inclusive policy, vowing not only to include transgender people in all of its work, but also never to support any policies or laws that are not trans-inclusive. In 2002, PFLAG's Transgender Network, also known as TNET, became PFLAG's first official "Special Affiliate", recognized with the same privileges and responsibilities as regular chapters. In 2013, TNET was replaced by the Transgender and Gender Nonconforming (TGNC) Advisory Council.

In 2004, PFLAG/Chicago was inducted into the Chicago Gay and Lesbian Hall of Fame as a Friend of the Community.

In 2013, Jeanne Manford was awarded the Presidential Citizens Medal by then President Barack Obama.

In 2013, a bronze plaque was installed at The Church of the Village in Greenwich Village, memorializing the fact that the first meeting of what came to be PFLAG was held at the church in 1973. The plaque reads,In 1972, Queens schoolteacher Jeanne Manford walked alongside her gay son, activist Morty Manford, at the 1972 Christopher Street Liberation Day Parade, carrying a sign that read 'Parents of Gays: Unite in Support of Our Children.' The overwhelming response to that simple act led Jeanne, her husband Jules, and early pioneers of the LGBT equality movement to create a support group for LGBT people, their parents, family, and friends. The first meeting of that group - now known as PFLAG - took place on this site in March 1973. Placed by the Greenwich Village Society for Historic Preservation in partnership with PFLAG members everywhere, in honor of the legacy of love that began here.In 2017, PFLAG celebrated the 45th anniversary of founder Jeanne Manford's famous march with her son, gay-rights activist Morty Manford.

Programs
Straight for Equality is a national outreach and education project created by PFLAG National to empower new straight allies and trans allies who, unlike a more traditional PFLAG member, do not necessarily have a family or friend connection to the LGBTQ community. The Straight for Equality project was launched in 2007. This nationwide initiative expanded the organization's efforts to include more people in the equality movement.

Since the 2007 launch, Straight for Equality in the Workplace has been PFLAG's most successful initiative, with an array of workshops available to corporations in the US. In 2009, PFLAG launched Straight for Equality in Healthcare to educate and engage healthcare providers in all disciplines to be more culturally inclusive in their work. In 2012, PFLAG launched Straight for Equality in Faith Communities, which features faith-focused resources and tools for people of all denominations to start having critical conversations in their faith communities to create more welcoming institutions. And in 2014, PFLAG launched a new trans ally program through Straight for Equality.

Each year since 2009, PFLAG National has held the Straight for Equality Awards Gala, the only awards gala that exclusively celebrates the contributions of straight allies to the movement for LGBT equality.  Past winners include civil rights pioneers like Maya Angelou and Johnnetta B. Cole; entertainer Liza Minnelli; actors Rosie Perez, Patrick Stewart, Martha Plimpton, and Sigourney Weaver; Broadway stars Audra McDonald and Will Swenson; sports icons Brendon Ayanbadejo, Scott Fujita, Chris Kluwe, and Hudson Taylor; authors Charlaine Harris and John Irving; faith leaders like Jay Bakker; and organizations including IBM, KPMG, MetLife, Sodexo, and Whirlpool.

Cultivating Respect: Safe Schools For All is PFLAG National's umbrella program to support the efforts of educators, parents, and other trusted adults to make schools safe and inclusive.

Claim Your Rights, created in partnership with GLSEN, is a program to help parents, teachers, administrators and other trusted adults file complaints with the Office for Civil Rights at the US Department of Education on behalf of youth who have experienced school-based bullying, harassment, or discrimination.

PFLAG Connects was created in April 2020 in response to the COVID-19 pandemic. Hundreds of PFLAG's local chapters moved their in-person support meetings to virtual meetings. PFLAG National also launched PFLAG Connects: Communities which are national support group meetings for a variety of BIPOC communities.

Campaigns

In the mid-1990s, "Project Open Mind" caused some controversy from Pat Robertson. He threatened to sue PFLAG and any television station that aired the project's ads, which showed clips of anti-LGBT quotes from several people, including Robertson, Jerry Falwell, and United States Senator Jesse Helms.  The ads can currently be seen on the Commercial Closet webpage.

Advocacy work
PFLAG National and the PFLAG chapter network engages in advocacy at the local, state and federal level and has issued public policy statements on a wide variety of issues. In the early 1990s, PFLAG chapters in Massachusetts helped pass the first Safe Schools legislation in the country. By the mid-1990s a PFLAG family was responsible for the Department of Education's ruling that Title IX also protected gay and lesbian students from harassment based on sexual orientation. PFLAG put the Religious Right on the defensive, when Pat Robertson threatened to sue any station that carried Project Open Mind advertisements. The resulting media coverage drew national attention to PFLAG's message linking hate speech with hate crimes and LGBT teen suicide. PFLAG National campaigned to repeal "don't ask, don't tell" and in the fight for marriage equality in the United States—including filing an amicus brief with the United States Supreme Court. It continues working to end the practice of so-called "conversion therapy", to combat laws that permit discrimination under the guise of religious freedom such as the Religious Freedom Restoration Act, and more.

List of presidents

Outside the United States
Similarly purposed (and sometimes similarly named) organizations have been established outside the United States since PFLAG's 1973 establishment, although the majority of such organizations are unaffiliated with each other or with the PFLAG National in the U.S. (the founding organization). Most recently, a PFLAG organization in People's Republic of China, PFLAG China, was established in June 2008 by Wu Youjian in Guangzhou after she accepted her son's homosexuality.

Other organizations
 Tehila (Israel)
 Families and Friends of Lesbians and Gays (United Kingdom)
 PFLAG Canada (Separately originated, similarly named)
 Tels Quels (Belgium)
 CONTACT (France)
 BEFAH (Germany)
 AGEDO (Italy)
 Association of Fathers and Mothers of Gays and Lesbians (Spain)
 FELS (Switzerland)
 Stolta föräldrar (Sweden)
 Families for Sexual Diversity (Latin America)
 PFLAG Vietnam (Vietnam)
 PFLAG China (People's Republic of China)
 PFLAG in Australia
 PFLAG South Africa
 PFLAG Myanmar/Burma
 Chapter Four Uganda

Popular culture
The final scene of the 1999 romantic comedy But I'm a Cheerleader depicts the protagonist's parents attending a PFLAG meeting.

The organization is featured in the TV movies Prayers for Bobby and The Truth about Jane.

PFLAG Canada supports the web series Out with Dad. The two main characters, Rose and her dad Nathan, attend PFLAG meetings during season 2 and 3.

In the US version of Queer as Folk, characters Debbie Novotny and Jennifer Taylor are members of the organization with Debbie serving as chapter president and Jennifer joining soon after finding out her son is gay.

PFLAG National provided guidance and support to Degrassi: The Next Generation when the show introduced its first transgender character, Adam Torres, in 2010. It offered a special resources page for viewers who wanted more information on trans issues.

PFLAG National is featured heavily throughout seasons two and three of Love, Victor on Hulu.

References

Footnotes

Bibliography

External links

 

Community-building organizations
History of LGBT civil rights in the United States
LGBT family and peer support groups
LGBT political advocacy groups in the United States
Non-profit organizations based in New York City
Organizations established in 1973
1973 establishments in New York City